The 1953–54 Western Kentucky State Hilltoppers men's basketball team represented Western Kentucky State College (now known as Western Kentucky University) during the 1953-54 NCAA University Division Basketball season. The Hilltoppers were led by future Naismith Memorial Basketball Hall of Fame coach Edgar Diddle and consensus All-American, Tom Marshall.  The Hilltoppers won the Ohio Valley Conference championship, and were invited to the 1954 National Invitation Tournament, where they were seeded as the number 2 team and advanced to the semifinals.  For the NIT consolation game against fourth seeded Niagara, Coach Diddle looked to build experience for the next year’s team, only allowing his freshman and sophomores to play.  During this period, the NIT was considered on par with the NCAA tournament.
This was one of the finest teams in Western Kentucky history, they led the NCAA in wins and Marshall averaged more than 25 points and nearly 15 rebounds per game, setting school records for scoring and rebounding.  Art Spoelstra, Jack Turner and Lynn Cole joined Marshall on the All-Conference and OVC Tournament teams.

Schedule

|-
!colspan=6| Regular Season

|-

|-
!colspan=6| 1954 Ohio Valley Conference Tournament

|-
!colspan=6| 1954 National Invitation Tournament

References

Western Kentucky Hilltoppers basketball seasons
Western Kentucky State
Western Kentucky State
Western Kentucky State Basketball, Men's
Western Kentucky State Basketball, Men's